The 2015–16 Northwestern State Demons basketball team represented Northwestern State University during the 2015–16 NCAA Division I men's basketball season. The Demons, led by 17th year head coach Mike McConathy, played their home games at Prather Coliseum and were members of the Southland Conference. They finished the season with a record of 8–20, 5–13 to finish 12th place in conference. As a result, they failed to qualify for the Southland tournament.

Previous season
The Demons were picked to finish second (2nd) in both the Southland Conference Coaches' Poll and the Sports Information Directors Poll receiving one first place vote in the coaches' poll and three first place votes in the SID poll. They finished the season 19–13, 13–5 in Southland play to finish in a tie for third place. They advanced to the semifinals of the Southland tournament where they lost to Stephen F. Austin. They were invited to the CollegeInsdier.com Tournament where they lost in the first round to Tennessee–Martin.

Roster

Radio
Most games will be carried live on the Demon Sports Radio Network. There are three affiliates for the Demon Sports Radio Network.
KZBL (Flagship)
KSYR
KTEZ

Schedule

|-
!colspan=9 style=| Non-conference regular season

|-
!colspan=9 style=| Conference Games

|-

See also
2015–16 Northwestern State Lady Demons basketball team

References

Northwestern State
Northwestern State Demons basketball seasons
Northwestern State Demons basketball
Northwestern State Demons basketball